Danilo Caçador (1 April 1985 – 13 February 2018) was a Brazilian footballer who played as an attacking midfielder for Chapecoense.

Danilo died on 13 February 2018 having suffered a heart attack while training with his club Juazeirense.

References 

1985 births
2018 deaths
Associação Chapecoense de Futebol players
Association football midfielders
Atlético Clube Goianiense players
Brazilian footballers
Campeonato Brasileiro Série A players
Figueirense FC players
Footballers from São Paulo